The 1974 World Lacrosse Championship was an international lacrosse tournament played at the Olympic Park Stadium, Melbourne, Australia from 30 June to 4 July 1974. It was the second World Lacrosse Championship with the first being played seven years prior. Four teams played in the 1974 championships with the United States taking out the round robin tournament defeating the other three teams that was competing in the tournament.

Results

|}

Standings

References

External links

1974
World Lacrosse Championship
1974 in Australian sport
June 1974 sports events in Australia
July 1974 sports events in Australia